Lamerton is a village and civil parish located 3 miles north-west of the town of Tavistock in Devon, England. The village's school is called Lamerton Church of England Voluntary Controlled Primary School; affiliated with the Church of England, it enrols about 50 children aged 5–11.

Historic estates
The parish of Lamerton contains various historic estates including:
Collacombe, long a seat of the Tremayne family, whose large  monument dated 1588 survives in St Peter's parish church.

Notable natives 
Philip Greening of Lamerton emigrated to Wisconsin, where he became a prosperous farmer, local official and state legislator

References

Villages in the Borough of West Devon